Ernst Schmutzer (26 February 1930 – 20 February 2022) was a German theoretical physicist.

Life

Early years
Ernst Schmutzer was born in 1930 in a small village in western Bohemia, which at that time had been part of Czechoslovakia for slightly more than a decade. By May 1945, when the war ended, he had attended schools in three different local villages. The area was occupied by the Americans on 1 May 1945, and less than a year later the entire German speaking population had been expelled. Schmutzer's schooling continued across the border in Weiden. By the time he passed his school final exams in 1949 he had been relocated again, this time to Waren (Müritz) in the northern part of what had at the time been designated the Soviet occupation zone in what remained of Germany. A few months later, in October 1949, the occupation zone was re-founded as the German Democratic Republic (East Germany).

Career progress
He studied at the University of Rostock, obtaining his first degree in 1953 and his doctorate just two years later. His dissertation, for which he was supervised by Hans Falkenhagen, concerned Electrolyte. After this, in 1955 he obtained a position as a research assistant at the Friedrich Schiller University of Jena which is where in 1958 he obtained his habilitation (a higher academic qualification). He obtained a lectureship at Jena in 1959 and in 1960 a professorship (with a teaching contract) in Theoretical physics. From 1968 till 1990 he was in charge of the "Relativistic Physics" field at Jena, serving between 1974 and 1978 as Dean of the Mathematics, Natural Sciences and Engineering faculty. Between 1990 and his retirement in 1993 he was Rector of Jena's Friedrich Schiller University in succession to Hans Schmigalla.

Focus
Schmutzer was concerned with the Theories of Relativity and Gravitation. He investigated extensions of General relativity theory in a supplementary spatial dimension which he termed "Projective Unified Field Theory" ("Projektive Einheitliche Feldtheorie"), extrapolating from the ideas of Theodor Kaluza. This invokes five space-time dimensions including a massive supplementary scalar field which, according to Schmutzer, can serve as an explanation for the accelerating expansion of the universe identified in the 1990s (as a candidate for dark energy) and for the Pioneer effect. According to Schmutzer's theory the singularities of General relativity theory are smoothed, so that instead of a "Big bang" singularity, matter begins with a more gentle progression which Schmutzer termed an "Urstart".

Politics
Politics was peripheral to Ernst Schmutzer's career, but in the German Democratic Republic it was hard to entirely ignore the country's ruling Socialist Unity Party. He joined the SED (party) in 1949, but was then expelled from it in 1958. The official report contained the conclusions that Schmutzer was in a fundamental disagreement with Party Policy regarding the practical transformation of the university. Following months of discussions in which Dr. Schmutzer had shown total disregard for party policy regarding scientific work, the conclusion was reached that his membership in the party could only be damaging to it, and he was expelled from the party. Political exclusion turned out less damaging to Schmutzer's career than might have been anticipated. He was one of just a handful of Jena professors permitted to visit western universities as a guest lecturer. In 1967 he taught at Queen Mary College in London.

International reputation
Schmutzer became one of East Germany's leading theoretical physicists. An internationally recognised authority on Gravitational Physics, in 1979 he was able to celebrate Albert Einstein's centenary by attracting to Jena the "9th International Conference on General Relativity and Gravitation" which took place in July 1980. In Jena he created a School of Gravitation Physics, members of which include Hans Stephani, Dietrich Kramer and Eduard Herlt, and which has established a name for itself, most notably, with investigation of precise solutions for the Einstein field equations. Between 1980 and 1990 he was a principal editor of the scientific journal "Experimentelle Technik der Physik".

Schmutzer's published output includes a comprehensive textbook on Theoretical Physics as well as an Introduction to Relativity Theory.
 His latest volume, "Fünfdimensionale Physik" ("Five Dimensional Physics"), appeared in 2009 and was republished in 2014.

Awards, honours and memberships
 1969: Member Academy of Sciences Leopoldina
 1977: Carus Medal and Carus Prize from the city of Schweinfurt (awarded by the Leopoldina Academy)
 1978: Service Medal from the Charles University in Prague
 1981: National Prize of East Germany
 1990: Corresponding Member German Academy of Sciences at Berlin (till 1992)
 1990: Member Academy of Practical and Applied Sciences at Erfurt
 1991: Member Saxonian Academy of Sciences and Humanities
 1995: Member Sudeten-German Academy of Arts and Sciences
 2005: Name entered in the "Golden Book" of the City of Jena

In Jena Ernst Schmutzer was an honorary member of the Burschenschaft Arminia auf dem Burgkeller (Arminius Student Fraternity of the City [hostelry] Cellar).

References

1930 births
2022 deaths
20th-century German physicists
Academic staff of the University of Jena
East German scientists
Sudeten German people
People from Tachov District
Members of the German Academy of Sciences at Berlin